Society for Local Integrated Development Nepal (SOLID Nepal), a nongovernmental, apolitical and nonprofit organization, established in 1997 dedicated on attaining optimal health of the people of Nepal by addressing different issues like sexual and reproductive health, non-communicable diseases, human resources for health or Health human resources and other health related issues as crosscuts. SOLID Nepal works to generate evidences, and promotes health & healthy behaviour of the people through research study, media & publications, advocacy, awareness & sensitization, trainings and social mobilization in a holistic manner by and with concerned stakeholders.

SOLID Nepal is actively functioning for empowering people to improve their sexual and reproductive health and to prevent them from non-communicable diseases by changing their lifestyles and risk behaviours. SOLID Nepal creates a conducive environment for active aged people for their complete participation in health and development efforts along with unified integration of individuals from all sectors for the collaboration of youth and society for its sustainability. It advocates stakeholders at local and national levels for the effective implementation of policies, plans and programs meant for the development of health and education systems in the country to make the young people competent in their professional walks.

Mission
Make comprehensive development programmes on health and healthy behaviour available at all levels, especially actively involving those people who need such programmes at utmost heights.

Objectives
 Generate evidences through researches in health and development focused on sexual and reproductive health, NCDs issues and healthy behaviour.
 Advocate and influence the concerned stakeholders for improving sexual and reproductive health of young people including women and children.
 Help to establish a good NCD surveillance system in the country that assists everyone to follow the healthy life style through interventions.
 Bring HRH surveillance system into practice and overcome the hindrances that come across different interventions in the retention of HRH in the country.
 Build up/or expand the capacity and network of the organizations working in the field of sexual and reproductive health and NCD.
 Coordinate and/or conduct NCD Risk Factors prevention and control activities through different sectors.
 Interlink and integrate the sexual and reproductive health issues as crosscuts in all sectors such as education, agriculture, forestry etc. so that young people (including women and children) will be able to exercise their sexual and reproductive rights and responsibilities and participate in achieving full-fledged quality sexual and reproductive health information, education and services.
 Encourage to accept the existing practices for the improvement of sexual and reproductive health (including indigenous system of medicines) and discourage the harmful practices and beliefs related to the same in both rural and urban communities by imparting evidence-based knowledge and life skills based education. 
 Empower vulnerable groups (Migrant Workers, Internally Displaced Persons, People with Disabilities, Commercial Sex Workers, Intravenous Drug users, Persons living with HIV) of the communities to minimize their vulnerability to unhealthy life styles, HIV and STI infections by promoting their active participation at all levels.

Strategies

 Identification of the concerned stakeholders, young people, vulnerable groups, poor, deprived and socially excluded people of the communities.
 Design and implementation of the programmes with active participation of those stakeholders and beneficiaries identified as responsible individuals by the programs/projects.
 Mobilization of the local resources for its proper utilization, sustainability and intra-promotion.
 Involvement of religious, political and social leaders into the program spirals.
 Networking, co-ordination and co-operation with likeminded organizations at public and private sectors.

Expertise

Research
Organizationally structured with research experts, SOLID Nepal has generated evidences through researches in health and development focused areas.

 An Operational Research (OR) on “Barriers to Effective Policy Implementation and Management of Human Resources for Health in Nepal” was successfully carried out following six different areas of HRH 2011.
 National level WHO STEP wise Non-Communicable Disease Risk Factors survey 2007/08 carried out in 15 districts of Nepal with the technical and financial support from South East Asia Regional Office, World Health Organization and planned by Ministry of Health and Population of Nepal.
 An Operational Research (OR) on “Barriers to Effective Policy Implementation and Management of Human Resources for Health in Nepal” was successfully carried out following six different areas of HRH 2011. Report 4,

 Young Peoples' Opinion on the Provision and Practices of Safe Abortion in Kathmandu Valley, Nepal

Publication

SOLID Nepal has wide-ranging experiences and capacity in media and publications. Since the beginning, SOLID Nepal has published ‘Youvan’, a bimonthly health magazine and was extended to the online version with the domain ‘www.youvanhealth.com’, Journalists and medical experts from different backgrounds have been contributing contents and knowledge for the publication.

Other publication includes and guiding and teaching manuals on different issues related to Sexual & Reproductive Health, Non-communicable disease, Life skills-based education, Gender based violence and Youth friendly Health Services. Also, SOLID Nepal has published advocacy kits contenting issues related to child marriage for government stakeholders, community population, media personnel and others stakeholders. Apart from this, SOLID Nepal has published a book on Ayurveda ‘Ayurveda Science-2nd Edition’.

Training
SOLID Nepal has been empowering individuals of different age groups from national to grassroots levels through intensive trainings to make them competent enough to utilize the learning to contribute for the development of the neighbourhood, community, society and the nation.

To achieve this, SOLID Nepal has developed and produced training manuals on Adolescent Sexual & Reproductive Health and Right (ASRHR) for Peer Educators, Life Skill Based education on ASRHR for teachers and conducted trainings and refreshers' trainings in districts across the country to convey good understanding. Also, SOLID Nepal has been provided trainings to research enthusiasts about research methodologies.

 Training on Advocacy and HRH issues to 30 selected CSOs (5 CSOs from each development region and 5 CSOs from national CSOs)
 Training on Peer Education, 2010-2011 
 Refresher's training on Peer Education, 2011-2012 
 Training on Youth Friendly Health Services, 2010-2011 
 Refresher's Training on Youth Friendly Health Services, 2011-2012

Workshops and Seminars
Since the establishment, SOLID Nepal has conducted national representing workshops and seminars with the records of huge participation from government agencies, international and national aid agencies, like minded organizations, media and civil society organizations.

SOLID Nepal has conducted workshops on sensitizing different stakeholders towards the issues such as sexual and reproductive health of young people, armed conflict and women's SRH and Rights in Nepal, HIV/AIDS, and Prevention of Mother to Child Transmission (PMTCT) of HIV. 
SOLID Nepal also has conducted workshop on Research Methodologies, non-formal education.

 Workshop with Journalists to Review and Enhance their Involvement in Policy Review, Implementation and Monitoring 2013
 Media Sensitization Workshop 2010 and 2011 
 National Advocacy Workshop for Improving Sexual and Reproductive Health of Young People by Increasing the Age at Marriage in Nepal 2009, 2010 and 2011 
 National and two regional trainings / Workshops on Prevention of Mother to Child Transmission (PMTCT) of HIV for frontline health workers. 2008  
 Sensitization workshop on HIV and Young people, 2006
 National consensus building workshop on HIV and Young People, 2006
 National Workshop on Armed Conflict and women's SRH and Rights in Nepal, 2005
 National Workshop on Young people's Sexual Health in Nepal, 2001 and 2002
 Planning meeting (Technical Consultative Meeting to discuss on SRE curriculum in Secondary Schools in Nepal, 2002)
 Workshop on Research Methodologies, 2003
 Training of Trainers for Master Trainers, 2003 
 Curriculum Development Workshop, 2003
 Finalization of the proposed content Framework Curriculum, 2003
 Sensitizing workshop for journalists, 2003
 Non-formal education workshop, 2003
 Interactive Meeting on YFS, 2004
 Facilitation skill training/workshop on SRH for M.Ed. health education students in central campus T.U.

Projects

1. HRH Assessment and Development of HRH Profile for the Public and the Private Health Sectors Workforce 2012, supported by World Health Organization, NHSSP (Nepal Health Sector Support Programme) and implemented by SOLID Nepal.

2. Improving Sexual and Reproductive Health of Young People by Increasing the Age at Marriage in India, Nepal and Bangladesh 

3. Gender Transformative Approaches for Improving Sexual and Reproductive Health of Young People In Nepal’

4. Support to Health Workforce Through Civil Society Engagement

References

Medical and health organisations based in Nepal
1997 establishments in Nepal